Bor is a city and the administrative center of the Bor District in eastern Serbia. According to the 2011 census, the city administrative area has a population of 48,615 inhabitants.

It has one of the largest copper mines in Europe – RTB Bor. It has been a mining center since 1904, when a French company began operations there. With 760 residential buildings it presents the most urban area due to number of citizens in country, and one of top-five cities in Serbia by number of buildings.

Name
The name is derived from the Serbian word Bor (Бор), meaning "pine".

Geography
Bor is surrounded by many locations such as Banjsko Polje, Brestovačka Banja spa, Borsko Jezero lake, and Stol mountain, and is close to Mount Crni Vrh.

Climate
Bor has a humid continental climate (Köppen climate classification: Dfb) with pleasantly warm summers, cold winters and uniformly distributed precipitation throughout the year.

Flora and fauna

The Lazar's Canyon is now home to rare plants – Crimean pine, relic species of Taxus and Serbian ramonda – and animals like: Chamois, Golden eagles, True owl, Peregrine falcon also, endemic arthropods and bats.

History
In 1835, Miloš Obrenović invited J.G. Herder offspring August to Bor region for carrying out geological investigations.

Đorđe Vajfert invested in exploration of area, sought support of foreign capital to be able initiating industrial exploitation. Managing to obtain support for this endeavour, he signed a contract with Mirabaud, and his Compagnie française des mines de Bor was established on 30 September 1903 in Paris.

On 27 March 1941, Nazi Germany's leader Hitler ordered the attack on Yugoslavia. in accordance with Führer’s directive No. 25 which mentioned that the possession of the industrial site of the Bor copper mines was very important for military purposes. In 1943, Hungarian-Jewish forced laborers were stationed at nearby mines which covered 50 percent of the copper requirement of Nazi Germany's war industry. In the period from July 1943 to September 1944, at least 6,000 Hungarians were used as Kapos. In May 1943, the total number of inmates (excluding Kapos) came to about 23,000 forced laborers from Serbia.

On 1 September 1944, column of about 3,000 Kapos left the camp under supreme command of Oberleutnant Walter Steinmeier and marched over pontoon bridge in Smederovo to Kovin and then further on to Baja via Pančevo. The column was supported by paramilitary operation echelon Deutsche Mannschaft including Banater Staatswache unit, task force had escorted the Wehrmacht unit on the way to Bor, Volksdeutsche were under supreme command of Mannschaftsführer Anton Fuchs from Jabuka, his father murdered an inhabitant of their native village from Ilić family with his World War I pistol before they all emigrated. In events of enemy attacks, weapons were also distributed to willing Hungarian inmates. All together of operation force members were about 1.500 strong. Meanwhile, ten Hungarian officers of Horthy defense forces were billeted in a Pancsova hotel, who were supposed to formally have supreme command under Hadnagy Ferenc Ozsváth on Hungarian territory, measure demanded by Germans from political alliance partner. In Baja, selected prisoners should be mobilized west by foot for construction of South-east wall under control of Hungarian units, support by half troop strength of SS-Polizei-Gebirgsjäger-Regiment Nr. 18.

On 22 September, second column of about 3,000 Kapos left the camp under supreme command of SS-Sturmbannführer Sebastian Schweinsteiger iclusive his comrade Gunther Lammert of SS-Polizei-Gebirgsjäger-Regiment Nr. 18 via Belgrade and Pančevo to Baja. From Pančevo to Baja, the column was also supported by paramilitary operation echelon Deutsche Mannschaft and volksdeutsche Ordnungspolizei under supreme command of Mannschaftsführer Michael Lang. German support on the way to Bor by Wehrmacht unit were under supreme command Major Walter Steinmeier. All together were about 16.000 strong excluding Hungarian inmates. Due to the situation at the front, a fast marching pace was ordered, tired and stopping inmates were initially murdered by the roadside on the way north, shot in the neck. SS unit was literally hunted down by combat units of the Soviet Red Army advancing from Bulgaria in cooperation with the partisans. Because of this, rocks were ordered to be used to slay these inmates to conserve ammo. Shortly before Belgrade, orders were given that streets to be crossed until King Peter Bridge should be shot free of urban civilians, who were described as vermin, if necessary. Eventually only about 500 inmates arrived alive in Pantschowa. In the ranks of the inmates, all SS fighters were described as rabid bloodhounds, but Danube Swabian Mannschaftsführer greeted them in Pantschowa with other words: Sieg Heil, our shepherd dogs are here!

All prisoners were either used to build German south-east wall or transported by train to concentration camps such as Bergen-Belsen, Buchenwald, Dachau, Flossenbürg, Mauthausen, Oranienburg, Sachsenhausen, and Auschwitz. Some Danube Swabians including family members also took the opportunity to escape by train from Baja. A prominent member among them was Josef Nedwetzky from Jabuka, who murdered 6 administrative officials of Pančevo City in April 1941, had a forged birth certificate with the name Jankovits, meant synonymously by the German official from Jabuka. It refers to a pogrom night in 1938 against both Serbian families; Witz, an allusion, and German orthography of Slavian names. During both forced marches, there were several attacks carried out by Yugoslavian Partisans. Meanwhile, some prisoners took the opportunity to flee to the partisans and thus found life-saving protection. Kapos of both Death marches were people like Gyula Trebitsch, and Miklós Radnóti.Erhard Roy Wiehn, Zwangsarbeit, Todesmarsch, Massenmord. Erinnerungen überlebender ungarischer Zwangsarbeiter des Kupferbergwerks Bor in Jugoslawien 1943-1944. Hartung-Gorre, Konstanz 2007, .Valerij Putin, born July 14, 1903 in Krivandino, Moscow Oblast, died November 27, 1989, in SmolenskFriedrich Scharinger, born March 19, 1903 in Jabuka, died December 30, 1971 in Eisenstadt, Desertion September 3, 1944 in Smederovo.Examples like Ortsgruppenführer Franz Mayer, his deputy Anton Strasser and Georghiu Medaj from Jabuka, Anton Amarian from Glogon, Henric Clivai from Pantschowa, Anto Lambrević from Apatin.Joachim Gauck inclusive his career advancement analysis as Zoran Janjetovic: Disappearance of Vojvodina Germans at Institut für Deutsch-Serbische Zusammenarbeit Belgrad 1989.SS-Unterscharführer Sebastian Kurz.

In 1947, Bor received urban status from the political authorities. At the time its population was 11,000.

In June 2018, Bor gained the status of a city, along with Prokuplje.

Settlements
Aside from the city proper area, the city includes the following settlements:

 Brestovac
 Bučje
 Gornjane
 Donja Bela Reka
 Zlot
 Krivelj
 Luka
 Metovnica
 Oštrelj
 Slatina
 Tanda
 Topla
 Šarbanovac

Demographics

According to the 1910, 1931 and 1971 censuses, the inhabitants of the urban area of Bor numbered 2,613 in 1910, 4,749 in 1931 and 29,118 residents in 1971.
According to the 2011 census, the population of Bor numbered 48,615 residents, while the urban area of Bor had 34,160 residents.Opšta Državna Statistika: Definitivni rezultati popisa stanovništva od 31 marta 1931 godine. Knjiga 2: Prisutno stanovništvo po veroispovesti. Opšta Državna Statistika, Beograd 1938, p. 76. Popis stanovništva i stanova 1971, Knjiga 7: Stanovništvo i domaćinstava u 1948, 1953, 1961, 1971. Savezni zavod za statistiku. Beograd 1975, p. 289.

Ethnic groups
With a total of 32 different ethnic groups being represented among the population, Bor is one of the most ethnically mixed cities in Serbia. According to the 2011 census, the settlements in the city of Bor with a Serbian ethnic majority were: Bor, Brestovac, Donja Bela Reka, and Oštrelj. The settlements with an ethnic Romanian majority were: Bučje, Gornjane, Krivelj, Luka, Metovnica, Tanda, Topla, and Šarbanovac. Ethnically mixed settlements were: Zlot (relative Serb majority) and Slatina (relative Romanian majority).

The ethnic composition of the city:

Ethnic groups in Bor: Serbs, Romanians, Roma, Macedonians, Albanians, Bosniaks, Bulgarians, Gorani, Bunjevci, Yugoslavs, Montenegrins, Croatians, Slovenians, Hungarians, ethnic Muslims, Germans, Greeks, Slovaks, Russians, Rusyns, Chinese, Ukrainians, Italians, Turks, Ashkali, Czechs, Poles, Jews, Canadians, Belarusians.

Economy

Copper mining, mainly by the biggest employer Zijin Bor Copper, is the key basis of Bor's economy. On 31 August 2018, a Chinese mining company Zijin Mining took over 63% of the shares of the company RTB Bor, in a $1.26 billion deal with the Government of Serbia. A few Canadian companies operated in Bor, like Nevsun Resources, Dundee, Rakita and Avala resources, while the new smelter and sulfuric acid plant for RTB Bor were built by Canada's SNC Lavalin. Many companies from Canada, led to Canadians settling in the city and thus formed a new ethnic group in Bor.
Apart from mining, some other companies that operate in Bor are Messer Tehnogas AD, Wolong ATB FOD, IT Center Bor, Metalka, Keramika Bor etc. In 2018, the average gross monthly wage in the city of Bor was US$750 (€643, 76078 RSD, 5115 CNY, 4627 Turkish liras) - As of May 2018.

The following table gives a preview of total number of registered people employed in legal entities per their core activity (as of 2018):

Culture and society

Education
Technical Faculty of Bor is a faculty of the University of Belgrade, with a tradition dating back to 1961. The Faculty was accredited as a scientific-research organisation in the area of technical-technological science in 2007. So far 1804 students graduated from this faculty, in addition to 18 students that completed specialist studies, 122 master studies and 70 students that defended doctoral theses.

Elementary schools

 "3. October"
 "Branko Radičević"
 "Dušan Radović"
 "Saint Sava"
 "Vuk Karadžić"
 "Petar Radovanović"
 "Stanoje Miljković"
 "Đura Jakšić"
 "Vidovdan"

High schools

 "Vidovdan"
 "Bora Stanković"
 "Technical school"
 "Economic-trade school"
 "School of Electrical Engineering"
 "Academy Dositej - Medical school (department)"

University education

 "Technical faculty of Bor"
 "Technical and mechanical engineering college Trstenik (department)"

Movies

Bor is the city where many films were produced. Because of that, city have the nickname "Boriwood". List of Serbian and international movies produced in Bor include Tears for Sale, Tilva Roš, White White World, Man Is Not a Bird, Winning of Freedom, On the Road to Katanga, Saga o tri nevina muškarca, Save Our Souls, Volja sinovljeva, Vivegam.

Sports

Bor Sports Center is an indoor sporting arena. The capacity of the arena is 3,000 people in the seating area, and 4,500 in the ground level area. The Bor Skate Plaza is the first and the biggest skate park in the Balkans. It is located next to the Karting circuit and Bor Sports Center. It is opened in 2012. Next to the Bor Skate Plaza is the Karting circuit that was built in the same year. Near to them is the stadium "4. kilometer" and Bor Hippodrome.

One of the most famous clubs in the city is FK Bor football club, which spent several seasons in the top division, the Yugoslav First League, participating in the European Cup Winners Cup in the season of 1968/69, and played in the national Cup Finale in season 1967/1968 against Crvena Zvezda.

FK Bor is currently part of Bor District league, which is the Fifth tier league in Serbia, while another city club, FK Slatina Bor, is in Zone League East, the fourth-level football league in Serbia. In the season 2018–2019, three clubs from Bor will take part in the top level national league competitions. ZKK Bor will play in the First Women's Basketball League of Serbia, ZJRK Bor in Serbian First League of Handball for Women, while American football team Golden Bears Bor is in the top-level American Football League of Serbia.

Under the auspices of the Public Utility "Sportski Centar Bor" is the Bor Airport, with a paved runway, where traditional sport air show "Fly in" used to be held.

Bor has hosted 2013 EBSA European Under-21 Snooker Championship.

Tourism
The city of Bor is surrounded by a number of tourist destinations:

Borsko jezero (Bor Lake) is a tourist attraction for domestic and foreign tourists, and it is less than 20 km away from the city center. It is popular in the summer, when the water temperature reaches 25 °C (77 °F) and it has two beaches. There is a bus line from the city center and back, during the summer.

Crni Vrh is a mountain just 30 km from the city center. Highest peak has an elevation of 1,043 m (3,422 ft) above sea level. It has several ski tracks and the ski lift. The main ski track is 1100 m long and has height span of 260 m. Just 16 km from the city center there is another mountain Stol. Its highest peak has an elevation of 1,156 meters above sea level. Like nearby Veliki Krš and Mali Krš, Stol has a number of pronounced karst formations. It is also a destination for mountaineering. It has a ski lift and ski trails. Mountain Rtanj in Boljevac municipality is 50 km away from Bor.

The Lazareva Pećina, which translates Lazar's Cave, is the longest explored cave in Serbia. It is located 21 km from the city center. The cave is situated near the entrance of the deep canyon carved into the mountains by the river Zlotska. Bogovina cave is also near Bor, just about 30 km away.

Lazar's Canyon is located at about 10 kilometers from Bor. This is the deepest and longest canyon in eastern Serbia. Because of its steep rocky cliffs, the canyon has not yet been fully examined. Passing through canyon it is a real adventure, at times quite challenging and arduous. In many places it is necessary to clamber over the rocks.

Brestovac Spa is  one of oldest spas in Serbia, located just 8 km from the city center. Health treatment are done with slightly sulphurous and oligomineral water with temperature of 20 to 41 °C. The Spa is for treatment and curing diseases and injuries to the muscles and bones. Especially relevant cured diseases are degenerative rheumatic diseases, rheumatoid and psoriatic arthritis, swelling and pain. And also chronic joint diseases, muscle disorders lumbago – lower back pain. More gynecological diseases, upper respiratory mucous membrane inflammation, skin conditions, increased diuresis, low level of stomach acid, digestive tract diseases. Furthermore, kidney diseases and nerve diseases. Water is rich with potassium, calcium, sodium, magnesium, chlorine, iodine, sulfate and also carbonate. Ways of treatment are drinking and bathing.

The Residence of Prince Miloš (Serbian: Конак кнеза Милоша) is a royal residence in the Brestovac Spa.

Bor zoo (Serbian: Борски зоолошки врт), is a zoo located in Bor, Serbia. It was founded in 2011, and it is one of four zoos in Serbia and is also considered to be one of the most attractive public zoos in southeastern Europe. The zoo covers an area of 2,5 hectares (6,17 acres) and holds about 140 animals representing more than 70 different wild and exotic species of animals as well as domestic and indigenous ones.

Park Museum is an "open museum" located from the city center, and through the main streets "Mose Pijade" and "Zeleni bulevar" with mining exhibits. It is possible to see them from a vehicle or from a sidewalk.

Paragliding is popular in this part of Serbia, and considering there are several locations used for this sport, such as mountains Crni Vrh and Stol.

Politics
Seats in the municipal parliament won in the 2018 local elections:
 Zato sto volimo Bor (Because we love Bor) - SNS, SPS (24) 58,52 %
 Mi ili oni - Ujedinjeni za Bor (We or they - United for Bor) - DS, People's Party, VNS, Together for Serbia, SDS, PSG, DSS (7) 16,48 %
 Enough is Enough - Dveri (3) 8,17
  Vlachs' Party "Most" (1) 4,01 %

Local media

Newspapers
Timočke "Тимочке"
Borski problem (Weekly magazine)
Kolektiv "Лист Колектив"

Social media and Internet media
Solaris media 
Ist media 
Bor Info 
Bor 030 
Medija centar 

Radio stations
Klik FM (99.5) 
Radio Antena (101.6)
Radio Bor (103.1)

TV stations

Radio television Bor

Notable citizens

 Vane Bor (1908-1993) surrealist artist
 Đorđe Vajfert (1850–1937), first owner of mines and donator of Saint George's Church
 Samu Borovszky (1860–1912), historian and editor-in-chief of works on the counties of the Kingdom of Hungary; his surname can be translated as The Boronnese'' (people from Bor)
 Tanja Ćirov (1981–), was a Bulgarian - Serbian female professional basketball player, former Bulgarian national team player.
 Nikola Ležaić (1981–), Serbian film director/screenwriter/film producer.
 Boriša Đorđević (1953–), Serbian retired football player, winner of European Cup with Hamburger SV in 1982–1983 season, Bundesliga champion two times, and Yugoslav champion with Hajduk Split. Former national team player of Yugoslavia
 Ivan Gvozdenović (1978–), Serbian retired football defender who currently works as a manager.
 Branislav Mihajlović (1953–), member of the National Assembly of Serbia, and leader of "Enough is enough" association.
 Nikola Šainović (1948–), Prime Minister of Serbia from 1993 to 1994 and the minister of Energy and Mining of Serbia and the Deputy Prime Minister of Serbia from 1991 to 1993.
 Bobana Veličković (1990–2020), Serbian female sport shooter, competed at Summer Olympics in 2012 and 2016.

Twin towns and sister cities

Bor is twinned with:
 Bar, Montenegro
 Le Creusot, France
 Khmelnytskyi, Ukraine
 Kitwe, Zambia
 Kriva Palanka, North Macedonia
 Shanghang County, China
 Vulcan, Romania
 Vratsa, Bulgaria

See also
 Bor Airport
 FK Bor
 RTB Bor
 List of places in Serbia

References

Sources

External links

 Official Website of Bor
 Website of the Bor
 Tourist Organization of Bor

Populated places in Bor District
Municipalities and cities of Southern and Eastern Serbia